{{Automatic taxobox
| image =
| image_caption =
| display_parents = 2
| taxon = Bochicidae
| authority = Chamberlin, 1930
| subdivision_ranks = Genera
| subdivision =
Antillobisium
Apohya
Bochica
Leucohya
Mexobisium
Paravachonium*
Spelaeobochica
Titanobochica 
Troglobisium TroglobochicaTroglohyaVachonium*
* Sometimes placed in separate family Vachoniidae, see text
}}

Bochicidae is a family of pseudoscorpions distributed throughout the Americas from Texas and Mexico to South America, from the
Antilles to Venezuela, Guyana and Brazil, as well as in Europe (Iberian Peninsula). Members of the family can be diagnosed mainly by features of the claws, notably the presence of exactly 12 trichobothria on each claw (members of other similar families possess many more) and a long, as opposed to short, venom duct. Some species live in caves while some are surface-dwelling.

Muchmore (1998) includes the genera Paravachonium and Vachonium'' in this family but many authors place these in a separate family, Vachoniidae.

References 

 
Pseudoscorpion families